WAIM (1230 AM) is a News/Talk radio station located in Anderson, South Carolina. The station is licensed by the Federal Communications Commission (FCC) on 1230 AM with a full-time power of 1,000 watts non-directional.

History
WAIM signed on the air in April 1935. Station owner Wilton E. Hall also founded The Anderson Independent/Daily Mail Newspapers. The radio station was the fourth station to sign on the air in South Carolina. In the 1940s and 1950s Glenn Warnock was the General Manager. Some of the radio personalities that worked at WAIM in the 1940s, 1950s and 1960s were : Doc Durham, Jimmy Scribner, Bob Poole, Marshall Gailiard, Al Joseph, Betty Black and Ken Rogers. Hall also owned WCAC FM 101.1. In the late 1970s, it became WAIM-FM. In 1978, WAIM-FM 101.1 became Rock 101. WAIM AM 1230 became "Anderson Country". Ansel Guthrie, an upstate Bluegrass/Gospel Music Pioneer, hosted a radio show highlighting the best in Bluegrass and Gospel Music with a show called "Knee Deep In Bluegrass". In 1982, the FM call letters were changed to WCKN. In 1992, the format was switched to news/talk.  The station now programs a news/talk format as "NewsRadio 1230" with talk hosts such as Rush Limbaugh, Laura Ingraham, Sean Hannity, and George Noory.  The station also has a morning show called The Rick Driver Show. WAIM-AM 1230 also broadcasts T.L. Hanna Yellow Jackets Football games in the fall with play-by-play by Christopher White and color from Frank Alexander.  In 2008, Bob Bierrman returned to the station for the first time since 1973 to do a weekend talk show.  He left the station in September 2008.  Waim's main competitors are WHQA, 103.1 FM, which broadcasts a morning talk show and country music & WANS, AM-1280; which broadcasts a talk/Sports format in the Anderson County and surrounding area.

During the latter part of 2008, the WAIM website was changed to include an online version of the popular Trading Post.  In early 2009, WAIM NetTV was added that streams live events, including Anderson County Council Meetings, and other governmental meetings.

External links
WAIM Official Website
WAIM NetTV
WAIM Trading Post

AIM